The 1979 Knutsford by-election was a by-election held for the British House of Commons constituency of Knutsford in Cheshire on 1 March 1979.  It was won by the Conservative Party candidate Jock Bruce-Gardyne.

The by-election took place just over a month before parliament was dissolved (7 April) ahead of the 1979 general election on 3 May.

Vacancy 
The seat had become vacant when the Conservative Member of Parliament (MP), John Davies had resigned due to illness on 6 November 1978. He had held the seat since the 1970 general election and had served as Secretary of State for Industry and Chancellor of the Duchy of Lancaster in the Government of Edward Heath, having previously been Director of the Confederation of British Industry.

Candidates 
The Conservative candidate was 48-year-old Jock Bruce-Gardyne, who had been MP for South Angus from 1964 until his defeat at the October 1974 general election. The Labour Party candidate was Alan Barton, and the Liberals fielded Robert Ingham. Michael Byrne stood as an Independent Conservative.

Result 
The result was a clear victory for Bruce-Gardyne in this Conservative safe seat, with a much increased majority of 16,880. Both the Labour and Liberal vote fell by a few per cent.

Bruce-Gardyne held the seat until its abolition for the 1983 general election, when he was effectively forced out of the Commons due to a reduction of the number of Cheshire seats. He was elevated to the House of Lords in the same year.

Votes

See also
Knutsford constituency
List of United Kingdom by-elections

References 

By-elections to the Parliament of the United Kingdom in Cheshire constituencies
Knutsford by-election
Knutsford by-election
Knutsford by-election
20th century in Cheshire
Knutsford